Piotr "Skawiński" Wilczewski (born 9 August 1978) is a Polish professional boxer and former EBU super middleweight champion.

Professional career
Wilczewski won his first 22 fights before facing Curtis Stevens on 11 July 2009, who stopped him in three rounds. On 3 March 2011, Wilczewski defeated Amin Asikainen by an eleventh-round TKO to become the European super middleweight champion. In his first defence of the title, Wilczewski lost a close majority decision to James DeGale on 15 October 2011. He unsuccessfully attempted to regain his European title against Arthur Abraham on 31 March 2012, losing a unanimous decision.

Professional boxing record

External links 

1978 births
Living people
People from Dzierżoniów
Sportspeople from Lower Silesian Voivodeship
Polish male boxers
Super-middleweight boxers
21st-century Polish people
20th-century Polish people